Editra is a cross-platform, open-source text editor, released under a wxWindows license. It is written by Cody Precord in Python, and it was first publicly released in June 2007. As of November 2011 the project is in alpha development phase, but "stable" builds are available for download. Editra has gained notability for being a text editor incorporated in Ren'py. The main site is down as of at least July 2019.

Features
It features syntax highlighting from Pygments. It supports many programming languages, including C, Cascading Style Sheets (CSS), HTML, Java, JavaScript, Perl, PHP, Python, Ruby and XML.  It also features syntax highlighting for BAT, DIFF, INI and REG file formats.

Editra supports features commonly found in other programmer-style text editors. It also supports:
 Auto-completion/calltips (Python, C, XML)
 Auto-indent
 Column edit mode
 Command mode
 Dockable customizable interface
 Drag-and-drop (tabs/file opening/text)
 Export to build-wxpython.py—build_dir=../bld/LaTeX/Rtf
 Edit remote files (FTPEdit plugin)
 Editable user profiles
 Extensible with plugins
 Integrated Python shell (PyShell plugin)
 Language keyword helper
 Line bookmarking
 Line edit commands (join, transpose, etc.)
 Multiple (synchronized) views of the same file
 Source control management (project plugin)
 Syntax highlighting (60+ languages)
 Unicode support
 vi keybinding support
 Zoom in/out

See also 
 List of text editors
 Comparison of text editors

References

External links 

 official website - No longer in operation
 editra Google Project
 Pygments — Python syntax highlighter

Free text editors
Software that uses wxWidgets
2007 software